Teun Buijs (born 24 February 1960) is a Dutch volleyball player. He competed in the men's tournament at the 1988 Summer Olympics.

References

External links
 

1960 births
Living people
Dutch men's volleyball players
Olympic volleyball players of the Netherlands
Volleyball players at the 1988 Summer Olympics
People from Oostzaan
Sportspeople from North Holland